Hypercompe cunigunda is a moth of the family Erebidae first described by Caspar Stoll in 1781. It is found in French Guiana, Suriname, Brazil, Venezuela, Ecuador and Bolivia.

The larvae have been recorded feeding on Melothria pendula.

References

cunigunda
Moths described in 1781